The Hockey Four Nations Cup was an international women's field hockey tournament held by the International Hockey Federation and the Deutscher Hockey-Bund.

The Netherlands are the reigning champions.

Format
Since its inception in 2008, the tournament has been an invitational event, allowing four nations to compete against one another. The tournament is played in a single round-robin system, with the nation finishing at the top of the table being declared the tournament champions.

The tournament generally comprises teams within the top 10 of the FIH World Rankings.

Results

Summaries

Team appearances

Statistics

All-Time Table

All-time goalscorers

External links

References

 
International women's field hockey competitions hosted by Germany
International field hockey competitions hosted by Germany